The 2018 Campeonato Baiano de Futebol was the 114th edition of Bahia's top professional football league. The competition began on 21 January and ended on 8 April. Bahia won the championship for the 47th time.

First phase

Semifinals

|}

Finals

Bahia won 3–1 on aggregate.

References

2018 in Brazilian football leagues
Campeonato Baiano